Kosh is a village in the Ashtarak Municipality of the Aragatsotn Province of Armenia, 18 km south-west of the district centre Ashtarak.  The town is attested as Kvash in early Christian times. In the town are ruins of a 13th-century church - Saint Grigor - and a castle which has yielded Hellenistic pottery remains.  There are numerous remains from early Iron Age residential ruins and buildings of large basalt stone blocks.

Gallery

References

 
 World Gazetteer: Armenia – World-Gazetteer.com
 Report of the results of the 2001 Armenian Census
 Kiesling, Rediscovering Armenia, p. 17, available online at the US embassy to Armenia's website

Populated places in Aragatsotn Province